Washington State's Supreme Court has 9 members elected at large.  In 2004, 3 members of the court were up for election.

State Supreme Court Justice Position #1

State Supreme Court Justice Position #5

State Supreme Court Justice Position #6

References

See also

Supreme Court
2004